The Tuscarora Mountains are a mountain range in Elko and Eureka counties of northern, Nevada. The southern perimeter of the north-south mountain range is the Humboldt River and valley. The community of Tuscarora lies on the east flank of the range.

The range is named after the Tuscarora people.

References 

Mountains
Mountain ranges of Nevada
Mountain ranges of Elko County, Nevada